Hillbilly Hare is a 1950 Warner Bros. Merrie Melodies cartoon directed by Robert McKimson.   The short was released on August 12, 1950 and stars Bugs Bunny.

Plot

Bugs Bunny is vacationing in the Ozarks and stumbles into the territory of two hillbilly brothers, Curt and Punkinhead Martin. The brothers figure Bugs as being a member of The Coy Clan they are feuding with and make several attempts to shoot him. Bugs foils them each time. Curt and Punkinhead are determined to get revenge on Bugs for their humiliation. Bugs easily outsmarts them and eventually, dressed as an attractive hillbilly girl, tricks them into doing a square dance. The dance tune starts as a straightforward version of "Skip to My Lou" played and called by the jukebox band, "The Sow Belly Trio". Shortly into it, Bugs deliberately unplugs the jukebox, removes the dress and takes over fiddling and square dance calling, still to the beat and rhythm of the song, but manipulating the Martins through a series of slapstick comedy gags. Bugs proceeds to assign the Martins increasingly bizarre and violent directives, which the brothers unquestioningly follow with hilarious results. Finally, with the Martins having promenaded off a cliff, Bugs finishes the dance by having the Martins groggily bow to each other (before collapsing due to exhaustion from the whole "dance") and saying, "And THAT is all!" and playing six final notes on the fiddle, before the cartoon ends.

Voice cast 
Mel Blanc as Bugs Bunny & Curt Martin
John T. Smith as Punkinhead Martin & Sow Belly Trio Caller

Censorship 
 This cartoon saw major editing when aired on ABC due to violent content. The following scenes were edited:
 The scene where Bugs mistakes Curt's gun for a camera and has his carrot shot full of holes was cut.
 The scene where Curt unties his rifle barrel, gets blasted in the face, was cut.
 The scene where Bugs meets up with Punkinhead, and Bugs reverses the gun barrel so that the second hillbilly is blown up was cut.
 The aftermath of the explosion in the dynamite shack sequence where Curt comes out with Bugs' lit lighter and says, "I think y'all are usin' too strong a fluid!" was also cut.
 The line during the square-dance ending that goes: Grab a fence post/Hold it tight/Whomp yer partner/Wit' all yer might/Hit 'im in the shin/Hit 'im in the head/Hit 'im again/The critter ain't dead/Whomp 'im low and whomp 'im high/Stick yer finger in his eye/Pretty l'il rhythm/Pretty l'il sound/Bang yer head against the ground (and the ensuing comic violence that follows) was also cut.

Appearance in pop culture
The hillbillies in Hillbilly Hare have appeared in the DC Looney Tunes comic book series, and had a cameo along with Bugs in the Histeria! episode "Great Heroes of France". They also make a brief cameo in Space Jam (they are briefly seen with the other Looney Tunes characters watching the basketball game between the Tune Squad and the Monstars). They are also part of the characters in the television series New Looney Tunes.

Reception
Animation historian Mike Mallory writes, "With Hillbilly Hare, director Robert McKimson, story man Tedd Pierce, and composer Carl Stalling combined to create a comedic perfect storm: the picture without the soundtrack is funny; the soundtrack without the picture is funny; and the music by itself is funny... What elevates Hillbilly Hare to the top rank of Looney Tunes cartoons is its second half, a relentless, hilariously insane square dance called by Bugs (channeling the Western swing musician Bob Wills). The rabbit's instructions are religiously carried out by the hillbillies, who bludgeon each other senseless in the process. This three-minute crescendo of slapstick is one of the greatest sustained pieces of comedy ever drawn."
The gag of Bugs Bunny refixing his opponents gun so it will literally backfire is seen in 1957 Pre-Hysterical Hare.

Months after the films release, a letter from Warren, Pennsylvania was sent to the studio, requesting for Bugs' square dancing calls that were used during the film's climax. McKimson also considered putting the short up for an Academy Award for Best Animated Short Film, however producer Edward Selzer refused to submit it for consideration.

Home media
 Hillbilly Hare is available (uncensored and uncut) on Looney Tunes Golden Collection: Volume 3, Disc 1.
 A shortened version featuring just the square dance is available on WB Kids' channel on YouTube.

References

External links

1950 films
1950 animated films
1950 short films
Merrie Melodies short films
Bugs Bunny films
Animated films about revenge
Films directed by Robert McKimson
Films scored by Carl Stalling
Films set in the Ozarks
1950s Warner Bros. animated short films
1950s English-language films
Films about vacationing
Films about hillbillies